Llangollen Community Hospital was a community hospital in Llangollen, Wales. It was managed by Betsi Cadwaladr University Health Board.

History
The hospital was completed in April 1876 and was extended in 1884. Soldiers suffering from gas, gangrene and gunshot wounds were treated in the hospital during the First World War. It joined the National Health Service in 1948 and it was extended to include physiotherapy and out-patient departments in 1958. It became a community hospital in the 1980s. After the hospital closed in March 2013, the building was demolished and the site was redeveloped for residential use in 2016.

References

Defunct hospitals in Wales
Hospital buildings completed in 1876
Hospitals in Denbighshire